Manners-Sutton may refer to:

People
 Charles Manners-Sutton (1755–1828), Church of England bishop
 Charles Manners-Sutton, 1st Viscount Canterbury (1780–1845), British Tory politician 
 Lord George Manners-Sutton (1723–1783), British politician
 George Manners-Sutton (1751–1804), British politician 
 John Manners-Sutton (1752–1826), British soldier and politician
 John Manners-Sutton, 3rd Viscount Canterbury (1814–1877)
 John Manners-Sutton (1822–1898), British Conservative politician
 John Manners-Sutton, 3rd Baron Manners (1852–1927)
 Lord Robert Manners-Sutton (1722–1762)
 Thomas Manners-Sutton, 1st Baron Manners (1756–1842), British lawyer and politician
 Thomas Manners-Sutton (1795–1844), English clergyman

Place
 Manners Sutton Parish, New Brunswick, Canada